

Joseph Halévy (15 December 1827, in Adrianople – 21 January 1917, in Paris) was an Ottoman born Jewish-French Orientalist and traveller.

His most notable work was done in Yemen, which he crossed during 1869 to 1870 in search of Sabaean inscriptions, no European having traversed that land since AD 24; the result was a most valuable collection of 800 inscriptions.

While a teacher in Jewish schools, first in his native town and later in Bucharest, he devoted his leisure to the study of Oriental languages and archeology, in which he became proficient. In 1868 he was sent by the Alliance israélite universelle to Abyssinia to study the conditions of the Falashas. His report on that mission, which he had fulfilled with distinguished success, attracted the attention of the French Institute (Académie des Inscriptions et Belles-Lettres), which sent him to Yemen in 1870 to study the Sabaean inscriptions. Halévy returned with 686 of these, deciphering and interpreting them, and thus succeeding in reconstructing the rudiments of the Sabaean language and mythology. In 1879 Halévy became professor of Ethiopic in the École pratique des hautes études, Paris, and librarian of the Société Asiatique.

Halévy's scientific activity has been very extensive, and his writings on Oriental philology and archeology, which display great originality and ingenuity, have earned for him a worldwide reputation. He is especially known through his controversies with eminent Assyriologists concerning the non-Semitic Sumerian idiom found in the Assyro-Babylonian inscriptions. Contrary to the generally admitted opinion, Halévy put forward the theory that Sumerian is not a language, but merely an ideographic method of writing invented by the Semitic Babylonians themselves.

Halevy was a professor at the University of Paris.

Biblical researches 
For the student of specifically Jewish learning the most noteworthy of Halévy's works is his "Recherches Bibliques," wherein he shows himself to be a decided adversary of the so-called higher criticism. He analyzes the first twenty-five chapters of Genesis in the light of recently discovered Assyro-Babylonian documents, and admits that Gen. i.-xi. 26 represents an old Semitic myth almost wholly Assyro-Babylonian, greatly transformed by the spirit of prophetic monotheism. The narratives of Abraham and his descendants, however, although considerably embellished, he regards as fundamentally historical, and as the work of one author. The contradictions found in these narratives, and which are responsible for the belief of modern critics in a multiplicity of authors, disappear upon close examination. The hypothesis of Jahwistic and Elohistic documents is, according to him, fallacious.

Works 
His works are numerous, and deal with various branches of Oriental study.

The following are Halévy's principal works, all of which have been published in Paris:

Mission archéologique dans le Yemen (1872)
Essai sur la langue Agaou, le dialect des Falachas (1873)
Voyage au Nedjrân (1873)
Études berbères, Epigraphie Lybique (1873)
Mélanges d'épigraphie et d'archéologie sémitiques (1874)
Études sabéennes (1875)
La Prétendue Langue d'Accad, Est-Elle Touranienne? (1875)
Études sur la syllabaire cunéiforme (1876)
La Nouvelle Evolution de l'Accadisme (1876–78)
Prières des Falachas, Ethiopic text with a Hebrew translation (1877)
Recherches critiques sur l'origine de la civilisation babylonienne (1877)
Essai sur les inscriptions du Safa (1882)
Documents Religieux de l'Assyrie et de la Babylonie, text with translation and commentary (1882)
Essai sur les Inscriptions du Safã (1882)
Mélanges de critique et d'histoire relatifs aux peuples sémitiques (1883)
Aperçu Grammatical sur l'Allographie Assyro-Babylonienne (1885)
Essai sur l'Origine des Ecritures Indiennes (1886)
 (1891–93)
Les Inscriptions de Zindjirli, two studies, 1893, 1899.
Nouvelles Observations sur les Ecritures Indiennes (1895)
Recherches Bibliques, a series of articles begun in "R. E. J."; continued, after 1893, in the Revue Sémitique d'Epigraphie et d'Histoire Ancienne, founded by Halévy; and published in book-form in 1895.
Meliẓah we-Shir, Hebrew essays and poems (Jerusalem, 1895)
Tobie et Akhiakar (1900)
Le Sumérisme et l'Histoire Babylonienne (1900)
Taazaze Sanbat, Ethiopic text and translation, (1902)
Le Nouveau Fragment Hébreu de l'Ecclésiastique (1902)
Les Tablettes Gréco-Babyloniennes et le Sumérisme (1902)
Essai sur les Inscriptions Proto-Arabes (1903)
Etudes Evangéliques (1903).

In the earlier part of his life he was a regular contributor to the Hebrew periodicals, the clarity of his Hebrew being greatly admired.

Bibliography 
 Hayyim Habshush & Alan Verskin, A Vision of Yemen: The Travels of a European Orientalist and His Native Guide. Stanford, California: Stanford University Press 2019. 
 Meyers Konversations-Lexikon, viii. 219;
 La Grande Encyclopédie, xix. 755;
 Fuenn, Keneset Yisrael, p. 479;
 Brainin, in Ha-Eshkol, iv. 257.
 Hayyim Habshush & S. D. Goitein, Travels in Yemen: an account of Joseph Halévy's journey to Najran in the year 1870. Jerusalem: Hebrew University Press 1941.
 Halévy, Joseph, “Voyage au Nedjran” (pdf), Bulletin de la Société de Géographie, Vol. 6, no. 4 (1873) and Vol. 6, no. 13 (1877). (French).

References

External links 
 Joseph Halévy on data.bnf.fr 

People from Edirne
1827 births
1917 deaths
Academic staff of the École pratique des hautes études
Turkish Jews
Academic staff of the University of Paris
French archaeologists
Jewish archaeologists
French orientalists
Jewish explorers
French Assyriologists
Explorers of Asia
Explorers of Arabia
Yemen researchers
Emigrants from the Ottoman Empire to France
Assyriologists